Donald Fred Williams (September 14, 1931 – October 16, 2011) was an American professional baseball pitcher. He played in Major League Baseball (MLB) for the Pittsburgh Pirates and Kansas City Athletics. He was signed by the Pirates with his twin brother, Dewey "Ted" Williams, who pitched several years in the minors.

Williams pitched in parts of three seasons for the Pirates and Athletics (1958, 1959, and 1962) making 11 relief appearances for a 7.20 career earned run average in 20 innings, and did not record a decision. His lone hit in four at-bats was a triple. Prior to that, he pitched for the University of Tennessee and nine seasons in the minor leagues.

Don and his brother Ted were physical education teachers also in Montgomery County, Maryland.. Don was a physical education teacher at Wayside Elementary School in Potomac, MD in the 1980s.

External links

Major League Baseball pitchers
Kansas City Athletics players
Pittsburgh Pirates players
Columbus Jets players
Dallas Rangers players
Salt Lake City Bees players
Lincoln Chiefs players
San Diego Padres (minor league) players
Baseball players from Virginia
People from Floyd, Virginia
1931 births
2011 deaths